Michiel Vos (born December 19, 1970) is a Dutch-American journalist and US-based correspondent.

Biography
He is married to filmmaker Alexandra Pelosi, daughter of former Speaker of the United States House of Representatives Nancy Pelosi.
They met in Amsterdam when Vos was working for the broadcasting station VPRO, as a presenter for special film nights. The couple have two children.

Vos hosts a Dutch/Belgian TV series called My America about his experiences as a European living in America.
 He regularly appears on Dutch and Belgian television and radio commenting on American political affairs and news as well as on his experiences in the USA. For over a decade he has had a weekly spot on De Wild in de Middag. Vos regularly appears as an American correspondent for the late-night talk show Pauw, Jinek, RTL Boulevard and EenVandaag.

The HBO film Citizen USA was based on Vos's journey to become an American Citizen.

Vos worked as producer on the HBO films: The Trials of Ted Haggard, Right America: Feeling Wronged, and Friends of God''. His wife Alexandra Pelosi is the sister-in-law of Peter Kaufman, who is the son of filmmaker Philip Kaufman.

Personal life
Michiel Vos married Alexandra Pelosi in Greenwich Village on June 18, 2005.

In November 2006, they had their first son Paul, named after Alexandra Pelosi's father Paul Pelosi. They had their second son on December 7, 2007, named Thomas, after Alexandra Pelosi's grand-father Thomas D'Alesandro Jr. Vos' sons often appear in his television programs. His American family is featured throughout his show. The San Francisco Chronicle pointed out that when Vos has screenings "a healthy contingent of Pelosis" are always present.

They live in Greenwich Village in Manhattan, New York City. Vos wrote a book about his favorite places in New York City.

References

External links
 
 My America 

1970 births
Dutch emigrants to the United States
Dutch film producers
Dutch political journalists
Dutch reporters and correspondents
Dutch television journalists
Living people
Pelosi family
Writers from Amsterdam